Zeenat  Bint-e-Sakina Hazir Ho is a Pakistani TV drama serial that was aired on Geo TV from 16 March 2010 till 15 June 2010. The serial is written by Mumtaz Bukhari and directed by Mohammad Naeem Khan. The serial is based on true events and highlights the drawbacks of Pakistan's prevailing feudal system. Retitled as Jaan Ke Dushman, it also aired in India on Zindagi.

Plot
Zeenat and Lakhmeer Khan, unaware of the consequences, decide to marry against the wishes of their families.  Angry at their marrying of their own accord, both families decide to take revenge from the couple. Bilal is accused of kidnapping and raping Shumaila. The couple is forced to live apart. Because of the allegations, Lakhmeer now faces life threats from certain elements who want to punish him for the crimes he supposedly committed. Zeenat is pressurised to go against Lakhmeer in the court and Lakhmeer is pressurised to claim that he never married SZeenat.

Cast
 Sanam Baloch
 Faisal Shah
 Mustafa Qureshi
 Khayyam Sarhadi
 Naila Jaffri
 Qaisar Khan Nizamani
 Yasir Nawaz
 Sohail Asghar
 Mumtaz Kanwal
 Rashid Farooqui

Facts
A serial that is based for the most part on true stories and has been filmed in real locations in Pakistan including Sukkur, Karachi, Jamshoro, Rahim Yar Khan and Pir Jo Goth. Almost all judicial proceedings and judges remarks have been taken from real life cases, highlighting how common the story is for couples who marry of their own free will.

External links
 Official website

Pakistani drama television series
Urdu-language television shows
Television shows set in Karachi
Geo TV original programming